Tarzan: An Original Walt Disney Records Soundtrack is the soundtrack for the 1999 Disney animated film, Tarzan. The songs on the soundtrack were composed by Phil Collins, and the instrumental score by Mark Mancina. The song "You'll Be in My Heart" won both the Academy Award for Best Original Song and the Golden Globe Award for Best Original Song and received a Grammy Award nomination for Best Song Written for a Motion Picture, Television or Other Visual Media, while the soundtrack album won a Grammy Award for Best Soundtrack Album. For his contribution to the soundtrack, Collins received an American Music Award for Favorite Adult Contemporary Artist.

Tarzan was the first Disney soundtrack to be recorded in multiple languages for different markets with Phil Collins also recording French, German, Italian and Spanish versions of the soundtrack, and he was assisted by composer Éric Serra to record and produce the French versions of the songs.

Commercial performance
The Tarzan soundtrack was released by Walt Disney Records on May 18, 1999. The soundtrack peaked at #5 on the Billboard 200 during the week of July 10, 1999, coinciding with the film's theatrical run. The album was a major comeback for Phil Collins, and put him back in the public eye. In the U.S. it reached double platinum status, becoming his best selling album of new material in a decade. 

A promotion was held at the Disney Store. Customers who bought the soundtrack received a free and exclusive single of "You'll Be in My Heart". The soundtrack itself was labeled limited edition, including a holographic cover and an individual collector's number.

The album has sold 2,586,000 copies in the U.S. as of April 2014.

Track listing
All songs written and composed by Phil Collins, with score composed by Mark Mancina.

Personnel 
Song Tracks (1-9 & 14)
 Phil Collins – vocals (1, 2, 3, 5-9, 14), all instruments except where noted (1, 3, 5, 6, 8, 9, 14), arrangements (1, 3-6, 9, 14), noises (4)
 Marc Mann – synthesizer programming (7)
 Jamie Muhoberac – acoustic piano (8), keyboards (8)
 Kim Bullard – programming (8)
 Carmen Rizzo – programming (8)
 Michael Landau – guitars (5)
 Rob Cavallo – acoustic guitar (8)
 Mark Goldenberg – guitars (8)
 Tim Pierce – guitars (8)
 Michael Thompson – guitars (8, 9)
 Nathan East – electric bass (3, 5)
 John Pierce – electric bass (8)
 Luis Conte – percussion (1, 6, 8, 9, 14)
 Will Donovan – additional percussion (8)
 Bruce Fowler – trombone (4)
 Walt Fowler – trumpet (4)
 Tommy Johnson – tuba (4)
 Joann Turovsky – harp (2)
 Mark Mancina – arrangements (1, 2, 5, 6, 14)
 David Campbell – string arrangements (8)
 Glenn Close – vocals (2)
 Rosie O'Donnell and cast – vocals (4)
 NSYNC – vocals (7)

Score Tracks (10-13)
 Mark Mancina – arrangements
 Phil Collins – drums, all instruments, vocal arrangements 
 Marc Mann – additional synthesizer programming
 Fred Selden – Ethnic flutes
 Joann Turovsky – harp
 David Metzger – orchestrations, additional choral arrangements 
 Don Harper – score conductor, additional choral arrangements 
 Sandy de Crescent – music contractor 
 Reggie Wilson – music contractor 
 Bobbi Page – vocal contractor
 Fonzi Thornton – vocal contractor
 Deniece LaRocca – music coordinator 
 Booker White – supervising music copyist for Walt Disney Music Library
 Joann Kane Music Service – music librarian for Walt Disney Music Library

Production 
Tracks 1-7 & 9-14 
 Phil Collins – producer (1, 3-7, 9, 14)
 Mark Mancina – producer (1, 2, 6, 10-14)
 Chris Ward – co-producer (10-13) 
 Frank Wolf – recording (1-7, 9, 14), mixing (1-7, 9, 14)
 Steve Kempster – recording (10-13), mixing (10-13)
 Gil Morales – additional engineer 
 Andy Bass, Greg Denenn, Tom Hardisty, Jimmy Hoyson, Andy Manganello, David Marquette, Sue McLean, Jay Selvester, Christine Sirois, Tulio Torenello, Rich Weingart and Mike Zainer – recording assistants 
 Rich Toenes – technical support 
 Ed Ghaffari – music editing
 Robb Boyd – music editing assistant 
 Daniel Gaber – music editing assistant
 Tom MacDougall – production manager 
 Andrew Page – music production supervisor 

Track 8
 Phil Collins – producer
 Rob Cavallo – producer 
 Cheryl Jenets – A&R coordinator 
 Elliot Scheiner – recording 
 Peter Doell – recording assistant 
 John Nelson – recording assistant 
 Chris Lord-Alge – mixing 
 Mike Dy – mix assistant 
 Rob Hoffman – mix assistant 
 Mike Silva – mix assistant 

Other Credits
 Chris Montan – executive producer 
 Joe Gastwirt – mastering at Oceanview Digital Mastering (Los Angeles, California)
 Luis M. Hernández – art direction
 John Blas – cover artwork 
 Bolhem Bouchiba – cover artwork 
 Daniel Clark – cover artwork 
 Derek Shields – cover artwork 
 Federico F. Tio – cover artwork 
 Susan Andrade – design 
 Marcella Wong – design
 Glen Keane – character development penciling
 Richard Haughton – back cover photograph of Phil Collins

Charts

Album

Year-end charts

Singles

Certifications

See also
Tarzan musical soundtrack

References

1999 soundtrack albums
Phil Collins soundtracks
 
1990s film soundtrack albums
Disney animation soundtracks
Walt Disney Records soundtracks
Soundtrack
Disney Renaissance soundtracks
Albums recorded at United Western Recorders
Albums recorded at Capitol Studios
Albums produced by Mark Mancina
Albums produced by Phil Collins
Albums produced by Rob Cavallo
Grammy Award for Best Compilation Soundtrack for Visual Media